|-
| Abdulići
| Bratunac
| 
|-
| Adže
| Maglaj
| Zenica-Doboj Canton
|-
| Adžići
| Gradiška
| 
|-
| Agarovići
| Rogatica
| 
|-
| Aginci
| Dubica
| 
|-
| Agino Selo
| Banja Luka
| 
|-
| Agići
| Derventa
| 
|-
| Ahmetovci
| Novi Grad
| 
|-
| Ahmići
| Vitez
| Central Bosnia Canton
|-
| Ahmovići
| Goražde
| Bosnian-Podrinje Canton Goražde
|-
| Ajdinovići
| Višegrad
| 
|-
| Alagići
| Kakanj
| Zenica-Doboj Canton
|-
| Alibegovci
| Doboj
| 
|-
| Alibegovići
| Bugojno
| Central Bosnia Canton
|-
| Alifakovac
| Stari Grad
| Sarajevo Canton
|-
| Alipašino Polje
| Novi Grad
| Sarajevo Canton
|-
| Amajlije
| Bijeljina
| 
|-
| Anđelije
| Foča
| 
|-
| Aranđelovo
| Trebinje
| 
|-
| Arapuša
| Bosanska Krupa
| Una-Sana Canton
|-
| Arbanaška
| Trebinje
| 
|-
| Argud
| Konjic
| Herzegovina-Neretva Canton
|-
| Arslanagića Most
| Trebinje
| 
|-
| Ataševac
| Drvar
| Canton 10
|-
| Avlija
| Čajniče
| 
|-
| Avramovina
| Gradačac
| Tuzla Canton
|-
| Avtovac
| Gacko
| 
|-
| Azapovići
| Kiseljak
| Central Bosnia Canton
|}

Lists of settlements in the Federation of Bosnia and Herzegovina (A-Ž)